PrideGP Grand Prix 2003 is a mixed martial arts video game developed and released by Capcom for the PlayStation 2. It was released in Japan on November 13, 2003. It is based on the Pride Fighting Championships (Pride FC).

References

2003 video games
Japan-exclusive video games
Multiplayer and single-player video games
PlayStation 2 games
PlayStation 2-only games
Capcom games
Mixed martial arts video games
Pride Fighting Championships
Video games developed in Japan